Michael Kantakouzenos (died 1316) was the first epitropos ("steward, overseer") of the Byzantine province of the Morea, a position he held from 1308 till his death in 1316.

In 1308, Byzantine emperor Andronikos II Palaiologos passed a decree, which stopped the appointment of new governors of the Morea every year and that this position be given to one person until his death. After the decree was passed, the first epitropos the emperor appointed was Michael Kantakouzenos. His coming to the Morea was a blessing for the local population in the poor province because he stopped the practice of corrupt governors who tried to pull off a "get rich quick" scheme in their 12-month term. He enabled economic stabilization within the province in his short 8-year term, giving his successor, Andronikos Asen, the possibility of starting a war of conquest.

Michael Kantakouzenos died in 1316. He was survived by his son, John, who became emperor in 1347.

References
Georg Ostrogorsky: Byzantische Geschichte 324 - 1453

1316 deaths
Michael
Michael
Byzantine governors
14th-century Byzantine people
Year of birth unknown
13th-century births